Audisio is an Italian surname. Notable people with the surname include:

Guglielmo Audisio (1802–1882), Italian Catholic priest and writer
Marco Audisio (born 1975), Italian rower
Tommaso Audisio (1789–1845), Italian Catholic priest and amateur architect
Walter Audisio (1909–1973), Italian politician

Italian-language surnames